Aren't You Dead Yet? is the fifth album by metal band Carnal Forge. It is the final Carnal Forge release with Jonas Kjellgren.

Track listing 
 "Decades of Despair" - 3:02
 "My Suicide" - 3:54
 "Burn Them Alive" - 4:26
 "Waiting for Sundown" - 3:14
 "Exploding Veins" - 4:08
 "Sacred Flame" - 2:33
 "Inhuman" - 3:28
 "Final Hour in Hell" - 3:07
 "Totally Worthless" - 4:23
 "The Strength of Misery" - 3:25
 "Ruler of Your Blood" (Japanese bonus track) - 3:32

B-sides 
 "God's Enemy #1"

Line up 
Jonas Kjellgren - Vocals
Stefan Westerberg - Drums
Jari Kuusisto - Guitar
Petri Kuusisto - Guitar
Lars Lindén - Bass

Notes 

2004 albums
Carnal Forge albums